Gumersindo Gómez (13 January 1929 – 14 March 2010) was an Argentine long-distance runner. He competed in the marathon at the 1960 Summer Olympics.

References

External links
 

1929 births
2010 deaths
Athletes (track and field) at the 1960 Summer Olympics
Argentine male long-distance runners
Argentine male marathon runners
Olympic athletes of Argentina
Sportspeople from Córdoba Province, Argentina